Fakirhat is a Upazila (sub-district) of Bagerhat District in the Division of Khulna, Bangladesh. The medieval "Sixty Dome Mosque" (ষাট গম্বুজ মসজিদ) and the Khan Jahan Ali Mazar is situated here.

History 
During the War of Liberation, the freedom fighters' camp in Deyapara was suddenly attacked by the Razakars. People from both sides were killed and wounded. In the village of Jaria, many houses were set on fire by the East Pakistani Army and the Razakars. The famous leader from the village of Shatshaia, Jabbar Khan, was killed by the Razakars at Jaria.

Geography 
It has 24,286 households and a total area of 160.68 km2.

Fakirhat Upazila, is bordered by Rupsa and Mollahat Upazilas to the north, Rampal Upazila to the south, Bagerhat Sadar and Chitalmari Upazilas to the east and Batiaghata and Rupsa Upazilas to the west. The main rivers are Rupsa, Bhairab and Chitra. The notable beels are Kalkolia and Foltita.

Demographics 
As of the 1991 Bangladesh census, Fakirhat's population was 123,956 people. 51.12% of the population are male, and females make up 48.88%. Fakirhat has an average literacy rate of 43% for those 7 years and older, while the national average is of 32.4%. The literacy rate is 49% among males and 36.7% among females.

62.55% of the population are Muslim, 37.43% are Hindu and 0.02% follow other religions.

Economy

Main occupations 
38.15% of the population work in agriculture and 16.94% as agricultural laborers, 2.81% in fishing, 6.07% as wage laborers, 14.86% in commerce, 3.01% in transport, 8.3% in services and 9.86% in other occupations.

Land use 
There are 10,072.03 hectares of arable land and 5,804.53 hectares of fallow land; single crop 64%, double crop 30% and treble land 6% land control.
Among the peasants 33% are marginal, 35% small, 25% intermediary and 7% rich.

Crops 

The main crops are Paddy, potatoes, betel leaf and vegetables. There are some crops nearing extinction, namely mustard seed, sweet potatoes and pulses.

Main fruits 
The main fruits grown here are coconuts, boroi, areca nuts, bananas and betel nuts.

Fisheries, dairies and poultry farms 
There are 7,463 fisheries, 33 dairies and 47 poultry farms.

Manufacturing 
Fakirhat has 1 ice factory, 1 pharmaceutical company, 10 oil mills, 20 rice mills, 2 frozen shrimp preservation companies.

Cottage industries 
There are 85 bamboo works, 52 goldsmiths, 65 blacksmiths, 136 woodworks, 30 potteries, 125 tailors and 15 kantha sewing workshops.

In addition there are 17 hat shops and bazaars; 6 fairs, most noted of which are Fakirhat, Lakhpur hat and Attaka Baishakhi Fair.

Main exports 
The main exports are coconut, betel leaf, shrimp, and betel nut.

Non-governmental activities 
The non-governmental activities in Fakirhat are Jagorani Chakra Foundation (JCF), Sukhee Manush, Drishtanto, Prodipon, Prisam, Viko Bangladesh, Nabolok, asa, brac, grameen bank and CARE.

Health centres 
There is an Upazila health complex, eight family planning centres, a satellite clinic and seven community clinics.

Arts and culture 
There are five theater groups, 30 women's organisations and 25 rural clubs. There used to be a cinema hall.

Points of interest
The archaeological sites of significance are Khanjahania Mosque, Sha-Awolia Bag Mazar and Mardan Pir Math, Tanker Per Mosque (Mulghair), Rural Orphan Centre, RRC.

There are 3 War of Liberation memorials and 1 memorial structure in Fakirhat.

Administration
Fakirhat Upazila is divided into eight union parishads: Bahirdia Mansa, Betaga, Fakirhat, Lakhpur, Mulghar, Naldha Maubhog, Piljanga, and Subhadia. The union parishads are subdivided into 67 mauzas and 87 villages.

Fakirhat (town) 
The area of the town is 22.09 km2. It has a population of 23476; male 51.93%, female 48.07%. The density of population is 1063 per km2. The literacy rate among the town's inhabitants is 47.4%. The town has one dak bungalow (rest house).

The administration of Fakirhat Thana was established in 1869; this was then turned into an upazila in 1983.

Transport  
There are three railway stations, but at present, all railway stations are inoperational.

The traditional means of transport are bullock cart and palanquin. These means of transport are extinct or nearly extinct.

Education 
Fakirhat's educational institutions include three colleges, a technical college, 24 non-government high schools, two government high schools, 27 madrasas, 53 government primary schools and 20 non-government primary schools. The noted institutions are Mulghar Government High School (1857) and Bahirdia High School (1892).

References 

 
Upazilas of Bagerhat District